Max Michel (1910–1988) was a German actor, film editor and film director.  During the 1930s he appeared in a number of French films.

Selected filmography
 Ein Kuß in der Sommernacht (1933)
 Between Heaven and Earth (1934)
 Lucrezia Borgia (1935)
 Passé à vendre (1936)
 La chanson du souvenir (1936)
 The Unsuspecting Angel (1936)
 The New Men (1936)
 Le tigre du Bengale (1938)
 Le tombeau hindou (1938)
 L'accroche-coeur (1938)
 La Loi du Nord (1939)
 The Singing Fool (1939)
 This Man in Paris (1939)
 Der Herr vom andern Stern (1948)
 Die kupferne Hochzeit (1948)
 One Night's Intoxication (1951)
 Wedding Bells (1954)
 Heimat Bells (1952)
 The Village Under the Sky (1953)
 Your Heart Is My Homeland (1953)
 The Blacksmith of St. Bartholomae (1955)
 Das Hirtenlied vom Kaisertal (1956)
 In Hamburg When the Nights Are Long (1956)
 Die Gejagten (1961)

References

Bibliography 
 Giesen, Rolf. Nazi Propaganda Films: A History and Filmography. McFarland, 2003.
 Goble, Alan. The Complete Index to Literary Sources in Film. Walter de Gruyter, 1999.

External links 
 

1910 births
1988 deaths
Film people from Munich
German male film actors
German film directors
German film editors

de:Max Michel (Schauspieler)